Many riots have occurred in Bratislava, currently the capital of Slovakia.
Bratislava riots (1848)—anti-Jewish riots during Revolutions of 1848
Bratislava riots in 1918, part of the post-World War I anti-Jewish violence in Czechoslovakia
Bratislava riots (1939)—reported as anti-Jewish or anti-German riots
Partisan Congress riots (1946)—anti-Jewish riots
Bratislava riots (1948)—anti-Jewish riots
Velvet Revolution (1989)

Riots and civil disorder in Czechoslovakia
History of Bratislava
Crime in Bratislava